Jennifer Rahim  is a Trinidadian writer. Her 2009 poetry collection Approaching Sabbaths received a Casa de las Américas Prize in 2010, for best book in the category Caribbean Literature in English or Creole.

She won the fiction category and the overall 2018 OCM Bocas Prize for Caribbean Literature, awarded at the NGC Bocas Lit Fest, for her 2017 book Curfew Chronicles.

Selected works 
 Between the Fence and the Forest, poetry (2002), 
 Songster and Other Stories, short stories (2007), 
 Approaching Sabbaths, poetry (2009), 
 Ground Level, poetry (2014), 
 Curfew Chronicles (2017),

Selected awards
 1992: Writers Union of Trinidad and Tobago Writer of the Year Award for Mothers Are Not The Only Linguists
 1993: New Voices Award of Merit for outstanding contributions to New Voices journal
 1996: Gulf Insurance Writers Scholarship to attend the Caribbean Writers Summer Institute, University of Miami; ; 
 2010: Casa de las Américas Prize for Approaching Sabbaths
 2018: OCM Bocas Prize for Caribbean Literature for Curfew Chronicles.

See also 

 Caribbean literature
 Caribbean poetry

References 

1963 births
Living people
Trinidad and Tobago poets
Trinidad and Tobago academics
Trinidad and Tobago women poets